Thomas or Tom Mellor may refer to:

 Thomas Barker Mellor (1849–1915), English photographer and organist
 Thomas Walton Mellor (1814–1902), British cotton manufacturer and politician
 Tom Mellor (ice hockey), American ice hockey player
 Tom Mellor (footballer), English footballer
 Tom Mellor (songwriter), English songwriter